There are at least 134 named mountains in Sanders County, Montana.
 Andy's Knob, el. 
 B Peak, el. 
 Bald Eagle Peak, el. 
 Baldy Mountain, el. 
 Basin Peak, el. 
 Bassoo Peak, el. 
 Beaver Peak, el. 
 Beaver Peak, el. 
 Beecher Peak, el. 
 Benson Peak, el. 
 Berray Mountain, el. 
 Big Hole Peak, el. 
 Billiard Table, el. 
 Black Peak, el. 
 Blackrock Peak, el. 
 Blacktail Peak, el. 
 Bloom Peak, el. 
 Border Peak, el. 
 Bottle Point, el. 
 Burke Hill, el. 
 Burke Summit, el. 
 Canyon Peak, el. 
 Castle Rock, el. 
 Cataract Peak, el. 
 Cherry Peak, el. 
 Chicago Peak, el. 
 Chimney Rock, el. 
 Clark Mountain, el. 
 Clear Peak, el. 
 Combest Peak, el. 
 Communion Butte, el. 
 Coney Peak, el. 
 Cook Mountain, el. 
 Cougar Peak, el. 
 Cube Iron Mountain, el. 
 Dad Peak, el. 
 Deemer Peak, el. 
 Deerhorn Mountain, el. 
 Divide Peak, el. 
 Dixie Peak, el. 
 Driveway Peak, el. 
 Eddy Mountain, el. 
 Eightmile Peak, el. 
 Eighty Peak, el. 
 Eightyseven Mile Peak, el. 
 Elephant Peak, el. 
 Elk Mountain, el. 
 Elk Point (4232 feet), el. 
 Elk Point (5046 feet), el. 
 Emma Peak, el. 
 Engle Peak, el. 
 Fatman Mountain, el. 
 Flat Top Mountain, el. 
 Gem Peak, el. 
 Goat Peak, el. 
 Government Mountain, el. 
 Graves Peak, el. 
 Green Mountain, el. 
 Grouse Mountain, el. 
 Haines Point, el. 
 Haystack Mountain, el. 
 Helwick Peak, el. 
 Henry Peak, el. 
 Hewolf Mountain, el. 
 Hill Seven, el. 
 Huckleberry Mountain, el. 
 Ibex Peak, el. 
 Jew Peak, el. 
 Josephine Peak, el. 
 Larch Point, el. 
 Lentz Peak, el. 
 Little Ibex Peak, el. 
 Little Thompson Peak, el. 
 Liver Peak, el. 
 Locust Hill, el. 
 Lone Cliff, el. 
 Lone Tree Peak, el. 
 Lost Peak, el. 
 Loveland Peak, el. 
 Markle Hill, el. 
 Marmot Peak, el. 
 McCormick Peak, el. 
 McNeeley Peak, el. 
 Minton Peak, el. 
 Moose Peak, el. 
 Mosquito Peak, el. 
 Mount Bushnell, el. 
 Mount Headley, el. 
 Mount Silcox, el. 
 Oliver Point, el. 
 Pashua Peak, el. 
 Patricks Knob, el. 
 Penrose Peak, el. 
 Perma Point, el. 
 Poplar Point, el. 
 Priscilla Peak, el. 
 Rattlesnake Butte, el. 
 Red Sleep Mountain, el. 
 Richards Peak, el. 
 Rock Peak, el. 
 Round Top Mountain, el. 
 Sacajawea Peak, el. 
 Saint Paul Peak, el. 
 Schmitz Mountain, el. 
 Scotty Peak, el. 
 Seven Point Mountain, el. 
 Sex Peak, el. 
 Sheep Mountain, el. 
 Siegel Mountain, el. 
 Skookum Point, el. 
 Slide Rock Mountain, el. 
 Snowstorm Mountain, el. 
 Sonyok Mountain, el. 
 Star Peak, el. 
 Stevens Peak, el. 
 Sullivan Hill, el. 
 Sunset Peak, el. 
 Table Top Mountain, el. 
 Taft Summit, el. 
 The Rock Hill, el. 
 Thompson Peak, el. 
 Three Lakes Peak, el. 
 Tuscor Hill, el. 
 Twenty Odd Peak, el. 
 Twenty Peak, el. 
 Two Trees Point, el. 
 Ulm Peak, el. 
 Vermilion Peak, el. 
 View Point, el. 
 Water Hill, el. 
 Wee Peak, el. 
 Wild Horse Mountain, el. 
 Windfall Peak, el. 
 Woodchuck Peak, el.

See also
 List of mountains in Montana
 List of mountain ranges in Montana

Notes

Sanders